The Billboard Tropical Songs is a chart that ranks the best-performing tropical songs of the United States. Published by Billboard magazine, the data are compiled by Nielsen Broadcast Data Systems based on each single's weekly airplay.

Chart history

See also
List of number-one Billboard Hot Latin Songs of 2009
List of number-one Billboard Hot Latin Pop Airplay of 2009

References

United States Tropical Songs
2009
2009 in Latin music